St. Stephen's Episcopal Church, or variants thereof, may refer to:

in the United States
(by state then city/town)
 St. Stephen's Episcopal Church (Longmont, Colorado), listed on the National Register of Historic Places (NRHP)
 St. Stephen's Episcopal Church (Newton, Iowa), listed on the NRHP
 St. Stephen's Episcopal Church (Innis, Louisiana), listed on the NRHP
 St. Stephen's Episcopal Church (Earleville, Maryland), listed on the NRHP
 St. Stephen's Episcopal Church (Batesville, Mississippi), one of Mississippi's Landmarks
 St. Stephen's Episcopal Church (Ashland, Nebraska), listed on the NRHP
 St. Stephen's Episcopal Church (Beverly, New Jersey), listed on the NRHP
 St. Stephen's Episcopal Church (Mullica Hill, New Jersey). listed on the NRHP
 St. Stephen's Episcopal Church Complex (Olean, New York), listed on the NRHP
 St. Stephen's Episcopal Church (Schuylerville, New York), listed on the NRHP
 St. Stephen's Episcopal Church (Casselton, North Dakota), listed on the NRHP
 St. Stephen's Episcopal Church (Chandler, Oklahoma), listed on the NRHP
 St. Stephen's Episcopal Church, Philadelphia, Pennsylvania, listed on the NRHP
 St. Stephen's Church (Providence, Rhode Island)
 St. Stephen's Episcopal Church (Ridgeway, South Carolina), listed on the NRHP
 St. Stephen's Episcopal Church (St. Stephen, South Carolina), listed on the NRHP
 St. Stephen's Episcopal Church (Charleston, South Carolina)

See also
 St. Stephen's Church (disambiguation)